Ahan may refer to,

Əhən, Azerbaijan
Ahan language, spoken in Nigeria
 , Korean-Japanese singer-song writer